Robert Kelly (born September 24, 1935) is an American poet associated with the deep image group. He is the 2016-2017 Poet Laureate of Dutchess County, New York.

Early life and education
Kelly was born in Brooklyn, New York, to Samuel Jason and Margaret Rose Kelly née Kane, in 1935. He did his undergraduate studies at the City College of the City University of New York, graduating in 1955. He then spent three years at Columbia University.

Teaching career
Kelly has worked as a translator and teacher, most notably at Bard College, where he has worked since 1961. Kelly's other teaching positions have included Wagner College (1960–61), the University at Buffalo (1964), and the Tufts University Visiting Professor of Modern Poetry (1966–67). In addition, he has served as Poet in Residence at the California Institute of Technology (1971–72), Yale University (Calhoun College), University of Kansas, Dickinson College, and the University of Southern California.

Kelly is the Asher B. Edelman Professor of Literature at Bard College (1986–) and Co-Director of The Program in Written Arts. He is a Founding Member of the Milton Avery Graduate School of the Arts.

Writing career
Kelly, on his influences: ″I want to say the names of the great teachers from whom I learned what I could, and still am learning.  Coleridge. Baudelaire. Pound. Apollinaire. Virgil. Aeschylus. Dante. Chaucer. Shakespeare. Dryden. Lorca. Rilke. Hölderlin. Stevens. Stein. Duncan. Olson. Williams. Blackburn.  I mention only the dead, the dead  are always different, and always changing.  I mention them more or less in the order of when they came along in my life to teach me.″

Kelly has published more than fifty books of poetry and prose, including Red Actions: Selected Poems 1960-1993 (1995) and a collection of short fictions, A Transparent Tree (1985). Many were published by the Black Sparrow Press. He also edited the anthology A Controversy of Poets (1965). Kelly was of great help to the Hungryalist group of poets of India during the trial of Malay Roy Choudhury, with whom he had correspondence, now archived at Kolkata.

Kelly received the Los Angeles Times First Annual Book Award (1980) for Kill the Messenger Who Brings Bad News and the American Book Award, Before Columbus Foundation (1991) for In Time. He serves on the contributing editorial board of the literary journal Conjunctions, as well as Poetry International.  He is married to the translator Charlotte Mandell.

Books of poetry
 Armed Descent, New York: Hawk's Well Press, 1961.
 Her Body Against Time, Mexico City: Ediciones El Corno Emplumado, 1963.
 Round Dances, New York: Trobar Press, 1964.
 Enstasy, Annandale: Matter, 1964.
 Lunes/Sightings, with Jerome Rothenberg, New York: Hawk's Well Press, 1964.
 Words in Service, New Haven: Robert Lamberton, 1966.
 Weeks, Mexico City: Ediciones El Corno Emplumado, 1966.
 Song XXIV, Cambridge: Pym-Randall Press, 1966.
 Devotions, Annandale: Salitter, 1967.
 Twenty Poems, Annandale: Matter Books, 1967.
 Axon Dendron Tree, Annandale: Salitter, 1967.
 Crooked Bridge Love Society, Annandale: Salitter, 1967.
 A Joining: A Sequence for H:D:, Los Angeles:Black Sparrow Press, 1967.
 Alpha, Gambier, Ohio: The Pot Hanger Press, 1967.
 Finding the Measure, Los Angeles: Black Sparrow Press, 1968.
 Sonnets, Los Angeles: Black Sparrow Press, 1968.
 Songs I-XXX, Cambridge: Pym-Randall Press, 1968.
 The Common Shore, (Books 1 - 5) Los Angeles: Black Sparrow Press, 1969.
 A California Journal, London: Big Venus Books, 1969.
 Kali Yuga, London: Jonathan Cape, 1970. A Cape Goliard Book.
 Flesh Dream Book, Los Angeles: Black Sparrow Press, 1971.
 In Time, West Newbury: Frontier Press, 1971
 Cities. West Newbury: Frontier Press, 1972.
 Ralegh, Los Angeles: Black Sparrow Press, 1972.
 The Pastorals, Los Angeles: Black Sparrow Press, 1972.
 Reading Her Notes, Uniondale: privately printed at the Salisbury Press, 1972.
 The Tears of Edmund Burke, Annandale, privately printed, 1973.
 The Mill of Particulars, Los Angeles: Black Sparrow Press, 1973.
 The Loom, Los Angeles: Black Sparrow Press, 1975.
 Sixteen Odes, Los Angeles: Black Sparrow Press, 1976.
 The Lady Of, Los Angeles: Black Sparrow Press, 1977.
 The Convections, Santa Barbara: Black Sparrow Press, 1977.
 The Book of Persephone, New Paltz: Treacle Press, 1978.
 Kill the Messenger, Santa Barbara: Black Sparrow Press, 1979.
 The Cruise of the Pnyx, Barrytown: Station Hill Press, 1979.
 Sentence, Barrytown: Station Hill Press, 1980.
 Spiritual Exercises, Santa Barbara: Black Sparrow Press, 1981.
 The Alchemist to Mercury: an alternate opus, Uncollected Poems 1960–1980, edited by Jed Rasula, Berkeley: North Atlantic Books, 1981.
 Mulberry Women, with drypoints by Matt Phillips, Berkeley: Hiersoux, Powers, Thomas, 1982.
 Under Words, Santa Barbara: Black Sparrow Press, 1983.
 Thor's Thrush, Oakland: The Coincidence Press, 1984.
 Not this Island Music, Santa Rosa: Black Sparrow Press, 1987.
 The Flowers of Unceasing Coincidence, Barrytown: Station Hill Press, 1988.
 Oahu, Rhinebeck: St Lazaire Press, 1988.
 Ariadne, Rhinebeck: St Lazaire Press, 1991.
 Manifesto for the Next New York School, Buffalo: Leave Press, 1991.
 A Strange Market, (Poems 1985-1988), Santa Rosa: Black Sparrow Press, 1992.
 Mont Blanc, a long poem inscribed within Shelleys, Ann Arbor, Otherwind Press, 1994.
 Red Actions: Selected Poems 1960-1993, Santa Rosa, Black Sparrow Press, 1995.
 
 Runes, Ann Arbor, Otherwind Press, 1999.
 The Garden of Distances, with Brigitte Mahlknecht, Vienna / Lana, Editions Procura, 1999.
 Unquell the Dawn Now : a collaboration with Friedrich Holderlin Schuldt, McPherson, 1999.
 
 Shame = Scham : a collaboration with Birgit Kempker, McPherson, 2005.
 Samphire, Backwoods Broadsides Chaplet Series Nº 97, 2006.
 Threads, First Intensity Press, 2006.
 May Day, Parsifal Editions, 2006.
 SAINTE–TERRE or The White Stone, Woodstock: Shivastan Publishing, 2006.
 Fire Exit, Boston: Black Widow Press, 2009.
 Uncertainties, Barrytown: Station Hill Press, 2011.
 Winter Music, with Susan Quasha, Barrytown: 'T'Space with Station Hill Press, 2014.
 The Color Mill, with Nathlie Provosty, New York: Spuyten Duyvil, 2014.
 The Language of Eden, Metambesen, 2014.
 Answer the Light, with Sherry Williams, Metambesen, 2014.
 Claws, with Barbara Leon, Metambesen, 2014.
 A Break in the Weather, Metambesen, 2014.
 Seven Fairy Tales, Metambesen, 2015
 Steps, Metambesen, 2015
 I Tarocchi Nuovi, Metambesen, 2015
 An Advent Calendar, Hudson: The Doris/Books, 2015
 Opening the Seals, New York: Autonomedia, 2016 
 Heart Thread, Hudson: Lunar Chandelier Collective, 2016 
 Certainties (The Maxims of Martin Traubenritter), Metambesen, 2016
 The Hexagon, Boston: Black Widow Press, 2016 
 The Secret Name of Now, New York Rio de Janeiro Paris: Dr. Cicero, 2016 
 Concealed in Brightness, with Charlotte Mandell, Metambesen, 2018
 The Caprices, Hudson: Lunar Chandelier Collective, 2018 
 Calls, Hudson: Lunar Chandelier Collective, 2018 
 The Cloudherding Book, with Charlotte Mandell, Metambesen, 2019
 Ten New Fairy Tales, Illustrated by Emma Polyakov, Kingston: McPherson & Co., 2019 
 Seaspel, Hudson: Lunar Chandelier Collective, 2019 
 Reasons to Resist, Hudson: Lunar Chandelier Collective, 2020 
 The Reader, Metambesen, 2020
 The Questing, Metambesen, 2020
 Doors / Türen, Selected and Translated into German by Urs Engeler, Metambesen, 2020
 Leaflight, with Charlotte Mandell, Metambesen, 2020

Prose
 The Scorpions, Garden City: Doubleday, 1967.
 A Transparent Tree, Kingston: McPherson & Company, 1985.
 The Scorpions (new edition), Barrytown: Station Hill Press, 1985.
 Doctor of Silence, Kingston: McPherson & Company, 1988.
 Cat Scratch Fever, McPherson & Company, 1990.
 Queen of Terrors, McPherson & Company, 1994.
 The Book from the Sky, Berkeley: North Atlantic Books, 2008.
 The Logic of the World, McPherson & Company, 2010.
 The Work of the Heart, New York Rio de Janeiro Paris: Dr. Cicero, 2020

Plays
 Oedipus After Colonus, and other plays, New York: Dr. Cicero Books, 2014.
The play Oedipus After Colonus takes as its point of departure Oedipus at Colonus, by Sophocles: it was first performed in 2010 under the direction of Crichton Atkinson at the HERE Arts Center in New York City as a part of HEREstay Festival - September, 2010.

Anthologies
 A Controversy of Poets: An Anthology of Contemporary Poetry, Edited with Paris Leary, Garden City: Doubleday, 1965.
 A Voice Full of Cities: The Collected Essays of Robert Kelly, Edited by Pierre Joris & Peter Cockelbergh, New York: Contra Mundum Press, 2014.
 A City Full of Voices: Essays on the Work of Robert Kelly, Edited by Pierre Joris with Peter Cockelbergh & Joel Newberger, New York: Contra Mundum Press, 2020.

Magazine affiliations 
 Chelsea Review (now Chelsea), co-founder, ed. 1957–1960.
 Trobar (with George Economou), co-editor 1960–1965.
 Matter, Editor, 1963– . Online edition, 2003– 
Matter, Online edition.
 Caterpillar, contributing editor 1968–1972.
 Los, guest editor New Series No. 1, 1975.
 Alcheringa:ethnopoetics, contributing editor, 1977–1980.
 Sulfur, Contributing editor 1980-1981
 Conjunctions, contributing editor 1990–.
 Poetry International, contributing editor 1996–.

Metambesen 
Kelly and Charlotte Mandell co-founded Metambesen.org(exploring the "flanges of words") in 2014. The homepage reads: "As citizens in the commonwealth of language, we are anxious to make new work freely and easily available, using the swift herald of the internet to bring readers chapbooks and other texts they can read and download without cost."  To date they have published over forty texts.

Translations into other languages 
 Poems and stories have been translated into Spanish, Portuguese, French, Italian, German and Serbian.
 Su cuerpo contra el tiempo, Mexico City, Ediciones El Corno Emplumado, 1963. Translated by Margaret Randall and Sergio Mondaron.
 A collection of short stories has been announced by Christian Bourgois in Paris.
 Il Maestro di Silenzio, translated by Anna Pensante, Milan, Editore Tranchida, 1993.
 Translations of other fiction forthcoming in Italian and German. Work appears in anthologies of modern American poetry that have been published in Mexico, Spain, France, Italy, Brazil and Germany.
 Il albero transparente, translated by Anna Pensante, Milan, Editore Tranchida, 1994.
 Geschichten aus Russisch, translated by Schuldt, Berlin, Edition Plasma, 1995.
 Schlaflose Schönheit, translated by Schuldt, Salzburg, Residenz Verlag, 1996.
 Scham/Shame (a collaboration with Brigit Kempker). Basel, Urs Engeler Editor, 2004.
 Die Skorpione, translated by Lorenz Oehler, Holderbank, roughboks, 2011.
 Die Sprache von Eden, translated by Urs Engeler, Holderbank, roughboks, 2016.
 Gewissheiten. Die Maximen des Martin Traubenritter, translated by Urs Engeler, Schupfart, Das Versteck, 2020.
 Doors / Türen, translated by Urs Engeler, Annandale-on-Hudson, Metambesen, 2020.

References

External links
Robert Kelly's home page, with much work online
Robert Kelly's Earthlink Homepage
Robert Kelly's Google Homepage
Robert Kelly at Bard
Robert Kelly's Electronic Poetry Center (EPC) Page
May Day by Robert Kelly, Parsifal Editions 2006
44-Page Interview with Robert Kelly in The Modern Review
Interview with Robert Kelly in The Brooklyn Rail
The Annandale Dream Gazette

1935 births
American male poets
English-language haiku poets
Bard College faculty
Living people
Poets from New York (state)
Writers from Brooklyn
University at Buffalo alumni
American Book Award winners
Municipal Poets Laureate in the United States